Alliquippa may refer to:

Aliquippa, Pennsylvania, a city
Queen Alliquippa, a leader of the Seneca tribe of American Indians